The 2008 Hawaii Warriors football team represented the University of Hawaii at Manoa in the 2008 NCAA Division I FBS football season.  The Warriors started the season with a new coaching staff headed by Greg McMackin, who had previously been the team's defensive coordinator.

2007 season recap

For the first time in school history, the Warriors are ranked in pre-season polls, 23 in AP Poll and 24 in Coaches Poll.

Undefeated Regular Season (12–0), The only major-college football team to be undefeated in the nation.
Hawaii earned its first outright  WAC title by defeating its arch rival  Boise State for the first time since its membership in WAC, with the Warriors winning 39–27. The game also became the WAC's historical game.

Colt Brennan finished 3rd for the Heisman Trophy, behind Tim Tebow of Florida (winner) and Darren McFadden of Arkansas (runner-up). 
 Brennan broke two major NCAA Division I FBS career records during the season in career touchdown passes and career TDs.  Both records were previously held by Ty Detmer of BYU. Brennan and wide receiver Davone Bess also tied the Division I FBS record for career touchdown passes by a quarterback-receiver combination.
The Warriors finished #10 in the final  BCS standing which gave them the bid to play for one of the BCS games, highest ranking in Hawaii's school history.
Hawaii made its first BCS bowl appearance and played against  SEC's  Georgia Bulldogs in 2008 Sugar Bowl on January 1, 2008, Georgia 41–10.
June Jones resigns at the end of the season to become the head coach at Southern Methodist University. Defensive coordinator Greg McMackin is tabbed to become the head coach in the wake of Jones' departure.

Schedule

Game summaries

Florida
Previous Meeting: First Meeting
Player Of The Game:

Weber State
Previous Meeting: First Meeting
Player Of The Game:

Oregon State
Previous Meeting: Oregon State 35–32 (2006)
Player Of The Game:

San Jose State
Previous Meeting: Hawaii 42–35 (2007)
Player Of The Game:
''see also 2008 San Jose State Spartans football team

Fresno State game
Previous Meeting: Hawaii 37–30 (2007)
Player Of The Game:

The Warriors tied their series against the Bulldogs, 20–20–1.
The game was also the Warriors first win over national ranked team on the road.

Louisiana Tech
Previous Meeting: Hawaii 45–44 (2007)
Player Of The Game:

Boise State
Previous Meeting: Hawaii 39–27 (2007)
Player Of The Game:

Nevada
Previous Meeting: Hawaii 28–26 (2007)
Player Of The Game:

Utah State
Previous Meeting: Hawaii 52–37 (2007)
Player Of The Game:

New Mexico State
Previous Meeting: Hawaii 50–13 (2007)
Player Of The Game:

Idaho
Previous Meeting: Hawaii 48–20 (2007)
Player Of The Game:

Washington State
Previous Meeting: Washington State 22–14 (1999)
Player Of The Game:

Warriors clinch bowl eligibility with seventh win of the season.  Will finish no worse than one game above .500

Cincinnati
Previous Meeting: Hawaii 20–19 (2002)
Player Of The Game:

References

Hawaii
Hawaii Rainbow Warriors football seasons
Hawaii Warriors football